Reasonable Doubt is the debut studio album by American rapper Jay-Z. It was released on June 25, 1996, by Priority Records and Jay-Z's Roc-A-Fella Records. The album features production provided by DJ Premier, Ski, Knobody and Clark Kent, and also includes guest appearances from Memphis Bleek, Mary J. Blige, Jaz-O, and the Notorious B.I.G., among others. The album features mafioso rap themes and gritty lyrics about the "hustler" lifestyle and material obsessions.

Reasonable Doubt debuted at number 23 on the US Billboard 200, on which it charted for 18 weeks. It was promoted with four singles; including "Ain't No Nigga" and "Can't Knock the Hustle". Reasonable Doubt was certified Platinum by the Recording Industry Association of America (RIAA) and, as of 2006, has sold 1.5 million copies in the United States. A critical success, it has been ranked on several publications' lists of the greatest rap albums ever, while many hip hop fans have viewed it as Jay-Z's best work.

In August 2019, Reasonable Doubt was released to digital and streaming platforms under Roc Nation's independent label, Equity Distribution.

Background 
In 1989, aspiring rapper Jay-Z was recruited by mentor Jaz-O to appear on his song "Hawaiian Sophie". He appeared on two more Jaz-O songs in the next year, but after Jaz-O was dropped from his record label, Jay-Z dealt drugs to support himself. He continued to pursue a rap career and appeared on two songs from Original Flavor's 1993 album Beyond Flavor. Jay-Z then caught Big Daddy Kane's attention and toured with him; they collaborated on Kane's 1994 posse cut "Show & Prove" along with Wu-Tang Clan's Ol' Dirty Bastard, Wu-Tang affiliate Shyheim, Sauce Money, and Scoob Lover.

Despite the exposure he received from Kane, Jay-Z was still without a record deal. He began selling tapes from his car with help from friend Damon Dash. The success of his street-level marketing led to a deal with Payday Records, which released his first solo single, "In My Lifetime" and its B-side "I Can't Get wid Dat". In an unconventional move, Jay-Z then spurned the record contract he had long sought and left Payday Records to form his own label, Roc-A-Fella Records, with Damon Dash and Kareem "Biggs" Burke. Jay-Z later explained that he thought he could do a better job of marketing his records on his own:

Jay-Z rented a small, cheap office for Roc-A-Fella Records on John Street in one of the "dreariest parts of the busiest city in the world". Jay-Z and his compatriots thought of their low-rent headquarters as a "starting point" that would eventually lead them to Manhattan. In 1995 and early 1996, Jay-Z appeared on records by Big L and Mic Geronimo, further raising his profile. At this point, he was still considered an "underground" rapper with a "new jack" style.

Recording
Reasonable Doubt was recorded at D&D Studios and mixed at Platinum Island, however, its beats were formed elsewhere. "Can't Knock the Hustle" was produced by Knobody at his mother's home in 1994, while the vocals were recorded on tour at a studio in Tampa Florida named Progressive Music with Mary J. Blige. Ski produced "Feelin' It" and "Politics as Usual" while recording with Camp Lo. The recording sessions were often competitive; Ski and Clark Kent created similar beats for "Politics as Usual", but Ski submitted his to Jay-Z first causing his to appear on the album. "Brooklyn's Finest" was a competitive, though friendly battle between Jay-Z and The Notorious B.I.G. in which Jay-Z tried proving that he is of Biggie's caliber, while Biggie tried brushing his rhymes off as insignificant. Although the rappers had already met on the set for the "Dead Presidents" music video, they discovered that neither wrote down their rhymes while recording. The recording of "Brooklyn's Finest" spanned two months and moved from D&D Studios to Giant Studios where the Clark Kent-sung chorus was recorded.

Music and lyrics 
Reasonable Doubt has Mafioso rap themes. David Drake from Stylus Magazine said the lyrics were characterized by "gritty realism". Writer dream hampton believed that although rappers had alluded to hustling before, Jay-Z "talks about what it can do to a person's inner peace, and what it can do to their mind". Jay-Z later said, "the studio was like a psychiatrist's couch for me" while recording Reasonable Doubt. AllMusic's Steve Huey described him as "a street hustler from the projects who rapped about what he knew—and he was very, very good at it...detailing his experiences on the streets with disarming honesty". Huey summarizes the album's subject matter saying:

AllMusic's Jason Birchmeier writes that the album's production exhibits characteristics of "the pre-gangsta era, a foregone era when samples fueled the beats and turntablism supplied the hooks", which "sets Reasonable Doubt apart from Jay-Z's later work". "Can't Knock the Hustle" features a smooth beat. "Politics as Usual" has an R&B sound and a sample of "Hurry Up This Way Again" by the Stylistics. "Dead Presidents" samples Nas' voice from "The World Is Yours" in its chorus. According to IGN's Spence D., "Ski brings back the stripped down piano fill style lending the track a late night jazz vibe" on "Feelin' It", and "22 Two's" has a "mournful jazz inclined groove" that prominently features string instruments. "Coming of Age" contains a Clark Kent-produced beat that samples the melody and drums from "Inside You" by Eddie Henderson.

Release and promotion 
Reasonable Doubt was released by Roc-A-Fella on June 25, 1996, through a distribution deal with Priority. It was not an immediate success, reaching a peak position of 23 on the Billboard 200 chart while selling 420,000 copies in its first year of release. It spent 18 weeks on the chart, and 55 weeks on the Top R&B/Hip-Hop Albums, on which it reached number 3. the album was promoted with the release of four singles, none of which reached the Top 40; "Ain't No Nigga" was the highest-charting single at number 50, "Can't Knock the Hustle" and "Feelin' It" did not peak higher than 70, and "Dead Presidents" did not chart altogether. The album sold 43,000 copies in its first week.

On February 7, 2002, Reasonable Doubt was certified Platinum by the Recording Industry Association of America (RIAA), for shipments of a million copies in the US. It remains the lowest charting album of Jay-Z's career. According to Respect magazine, it had sold 1.5 million copies in the United States by 2006.

Reception 

Reasonable Doubt was met with widespread acclaim from music critics. Charlie Braxton of The Source praised Jay-Z for evolving "from hip-hop sidekick to Mafia-style front man, blowing up the spot with vivid tales about the economic reality fueling what's left of contemporary ghetto politics". Entertainment Weeklys Dimitri Ehrlich commended him for rapping "with an irresistible confidence, a voice that exudes tough-guy authenticity", also noting the "unadorned but suitably militant" production. Tonya Pendleton of the Los Angeles Daily News stated that the album "hits you with rap's trends – Mary J. Blige riffs, Foxy Brown rhymes, Isley Brothers loops and more fashion info than Cindy Crawford", adding that "his sassy way with a lyric transcends the material" on the album.

Retrospect
Reasonable Doubt has often been considered by many fans to be Jay-Z's best record. He himself deemed it his best. According to Birchmeier, it differed from his subsequent albums by lacking "pop-crossover" songs and hits. Shaheem Reid of MTV explained, "Reasonable Doubt might not have the radio hits or club bangers of many of his other albums, but it may be Jay at his most lyrical—and certainly at his most honest, according to him". Huey said the lyrical appeal lied within Jay-Z's "effortless, unaffected cool" flow, and knack for "writing some of the most acrobatic rhymes heard in quite some time". According to Huey, this "helped Reasonable Doubt rank as one of the finest albums of New York's hip-hop renaissance of the '90s". Birchmeier, on the other hand, believed the superior quality of producers was more responsible for the album's reputation as a classic more so than Jay-Z. In a retrospective review for MSN Music, Robert Christgau said the album was "designed for the hip-hop cognoscenti and street aesthetes who still swear he never topped it," finding it "richer than any outsider could have known, and benefiting from everything we've since learned about the minor crack baron who put his money where his mouth was. You can hear him marshalling a discipline known to few rappers and many crack barons, and that asceticism undercuts the intrinsic delight of his rhymes".

Legacy and influence
Since its initial reception, Reasonable Doubt has received further acclaim from music critics and writers. According to Pitchforks Ryan Schreiber, it has often been "considered one of hip-hop's landmark albums", while Birchmeier said it was viewed like Nas' Illmatic (1994) as a classic hip hop album by a young rapper about their street and criminal experiences. Reasonable Doubt helped transfigure gangsta rap into Mafioso rap, popularizing the subgenre and the imagery of high class, expensive lifestyles and tastes in hip hop, including drinking Cristal, driving Lexus automobiles, and living out the plots of films such as Scarface and Carlito's Way. In the opinion of Miles Marshall Lewis, Reasonable Doubt was a "seminal" work that "shocked the world ... a personal touchstone for fans then Jay's own age who were getting their own hustles on—hip hop's young, gifted, and black". Jay-Z said that recreating Reasonable Doubt would be challenging, as he was living a different lifestyle with a completely different state of mind when he wrote the album.

Reasonable Doubt was named one of the greatest hip hop albums of all time by The Source in 1998, Vibe, who ranked it seventh on their 2002 list, MTV.com, who ranked it sixth on their 2005 list, and About.com's Henry Adaso; Adaso ranked it as the 14th greatest hip hop album, the second best rap record of 1996, and the fifth most "essential" hip hop album ever. Blender included Reasonable Doubt on the magazine's 2003 list of "500 CDs You Must Own Before You Die". That same year, Rolling Stone ranked it number 248 on their list of the 500 Greatest Albums of All Time, number 250 on the 2012 revision, and the album's rank shot up to number 67 on the 2020 reboot of the list. The magazine also named it the 17th best album of the 1990s. It was included in Vibes "51 Albums Representing a Generation, a Sound and a Movement" (2004), and Hip Hop Connections "The 100 Greatest Rap Albums 1995–2005".

In 2006, Jay-Z performed the songs from Reasonable Doubt at the Radio City Music Hall to celebrate its tenth anniversary. The concert's band included The Roots' drummer Questlove, the Illadelphonics, a 50-piece orchestra dubbed The Hustla's Symphony and Just Blaze, the performance's disc jockey. On "Can't Knock the Hustle", Beyoncé replaced Mary J. Blige, who was preparing for her Breakthrough Tour at the time. Jay-Z rapped The Notorious B.I.G.'s verses on "Brooklyn's Finest", and Jaz-O's verse was left out of "Bring It On". Jay-Z added a verse to "22 Two's" in which he says variations of the words "for/four" 44 times over the beat of "Can I Kick It?" by A Tribe Called Quest. Other alterations include Jay-Z changing a lyrical mention of Cristal to Dom Pérignon and Jay-Z's band "spruc[ing] up tracks like 'Regrets' to add more energy". Celebrities such as Alicia Keys, Young Jeezy, Jadakiss, Chris Tucker, LeBron James and Carmelo Anthony attended the concert. 3,000 tickets were put on sale; all were sold within two minutes according to Roc-A-Fella Records' website.

Track listing 

Notes
  signifies a co-producer.
"Can't Knock the Hustle" features intro vocals by Pain in Da Ass.
"Brooklyn's Finest" features intro vocals by Pain in Da Ass and background vocals by DJ Clark Kent.
"22 Two's" features additional vocals by Mary Davis.
"Ain't No Nigga" features additional vocals by Khadijah Bass and Big Jaz.

Sample credits
"Can't Knock the Hustle" contains samples of "Much Too Much" by Marcus Miller, "I Know You Got Soul" by Eric B. & Rakim and interpolations of "Fool's Paradise" by Meli'sa Morgan, and dialogue from the film Scarface.
"Politics as Usual" contains a sample of "Hurry Up This Way Again" by The Stylistics.
"Brooklyn's Finest" contains samples of  "Ecstasy" by The Ohio Players, "Brooklyn Zoo" by Ol' Dirty Bastard and interpolates dialogue from the film Carlito's Way.
"Dead Presidents II" contains samples of "A Garden of Peace" by Lonnie Liston Smith, "The World Is Yours (Tip Mix)" by Nas, and "Oh My God (Remix)" by A Tribe Called Quest.
"Feelin' It" contains a sample of  "Pastures" by Ahmad Jamal.
"D'Evils" contains samples of  "Go Back Home" by Allen Toussaint, "I Shot Ya (Remix)" by LL Cool J and "Murder Was the Case" by Snoop Dogg.
"22 Two's" contains an interpolation of "Can I Kick It?" by A Tribe Called Quest.
"Can I Live" contains a sample of "The Look of Love" by Isaac Hayes.
"Ain't No Nigga" contains a sample of "Seven Minutes of Funk" by The Whole Darn Family and interpolations of "Ain't No Woman (Like the One I Got)" by The Four Tops.
"Friend or Foe" contains a sample of "Hey What's That You Say" by Brother to Brother.
"Coming of Age" contains a sample of "Inside You" by Eddie Henderson.
"Cashmere Thoughts" contains a sample of "Save Their Souls" by Bohannon.
"Bring It On" contains a sample of  "1, 2 Pass It" by D&D All-Stars.
"Regrets" contains a sample of "It's So Easy Loving You" by Earl Klugh and Hubert Laws.
"Can I Live II" contains a sample of "Mother's Day" by 24-Carat Black.
"Dead or Alive Part 1" contains a sample of "Bigger's Theme" by Mtume.

Personnel 

 Jay-Z – performer, executive producer
 Damon Dash – producer, executive producer
 Kareem "Biggs" Burke – executive producer
 Big Jaz – producer, performer, mixing
 Memphis Bleek – performer
 Notorious B.I.G. – performer
 Sauce Money – performer
 Mary J. Blige – vocals
 Foxy Brown – performer
 Mecca – vocals
 Ski – producer, mixing
 DJ Premier – producer, mixing
 Clark Kent – producer, mixing
 DJ Irv – producer, mixing
 Sean Cane – producer
 Dahoud – producer
 DJ Peter Panic – producer, mixing
 Kenny Ortíz – engineer, mixing
 Joe Quinde – engineer, mixing
 Eddie Sancho – engineer, mixing
 Carlos Bess – mixing
 Adrien Vargas – art direction, design
 Cey Adams – artwork
 Jonathan Mannion – photography

Charts

Weekly charts

Year-end charts

Certifications

See also 
 It Was Written
 Only Built 4 Cuban Linx...

References

External links 
 Reasonable Doubt at Discogs
 The Making of Reasonable Doubt — XXL
 Jay-Z Marks Anniversary of Debut Album at Radio City Music Hall — The New York Times

1996 debut albums
Albums produced by Clark Kent (producer)
Albums produced by DJ Premier
Albums produced by Irv Gotti
Albums produced by Ski Beatz
Albums produced by Jaz-O
Jay-Z albums
Priority Records albums
Roc-A-Fella Records albums
Mafioso rap albums